Life on Earth may refer to:

Science
 Life
 Earliest known life forms
 Evolutionary history of life
 Abiogenesis

Film and television
 Life on Earth (film) (La Vie Sur Terre), a 1998 Malian film
 Life on Earth (TV series), a 1979 British nature documentary series

Music
 Life on Earth (Musiq Soulchild album) or the title song, 2016
 Life on Earth (Renee Rosnes album), 2001
 Life on Earth (Tiny Vipers album) or the title song, 2009
 Life on Earth, an EP by Summer Walker, 2020
 "Life on Earth", a song by Band of Horses from The Twilight Saga: Eclipse film soundtrack, 2010
 "Life on Earth", a song by Dala from Best Day
 "Life on Earth", a song by Snow Patrol from Wildness, 2018

See also
 Live on Earth (disambiguation)
 Living on Earth, a United States radio news program